Wang Junyong (born 11 April 2000) is a Chinese cyclist, who currently rides for UCI Continental team .

Major results

2019
 1st Stage 3 Tour de Iskandar Johor

References

External links

2000 births
Living people
Chinese male cyclists
Cyclists from Shandong
Sportspeople from Qingdao
21st-century Chinese people